

France
 French Somaliland – René Tirant, Governor of French Somaliland (1962–1966)

Portugal
 Angola – Silvino Silvério Marquês, High Commissioner of Angola (1962–1966)

United Kingdom
 Federation of South Arabia 
 Governor – Sir Richard Gordon Turnbull, High Commissioner of South Arabia (1964–1967)
 Minister – 
 Zayn Abdu Baharun, Chief Minister of South Arabia (1963–1965)
 Abdel-Qawi Hasan Makkawi, Chief Minister of South Arabia (1965)
 Ali Musa al-Babakr, Chief Minister of South Arabia (1965–1966)

Colonial governors
Colonial governors
1965